In mathematics, a Castelnuovo surface is a surface of general type such that the canonical bundle is very ample and 
such that c12 = 3pg − 7.  Guido Castelnuovo proved that if the canonical bundle is very ample for a surface of general type then c12 ≥ 3pg − 7.

Construction

Invariants

References

Algebraic surfaces
Complex surfaces